A biographical museum is a museum dedicated to displaying items relating to the life of a single person or group of people, and may also display the items collected by their subjects during their lifetimes.  Some biographical museums are located in a house, such as Casa Paoli Museum or other site associated with the lives of their subjects. Other examples of house-based biographical museums are Quinta de Bolívar in Bogotá, Colombia, the Keats-Shelley Memorial House, in Rome, Italy, and the Gjergj Kastrioti Skënderbeu National Museum in Krujë, Albania. 

Some homes of famous people house famous collections in the sphere of the owner's expertise or interests in addition to collections of their biographical material; one such example is The Wellington Museum, Apsley House, London, home of the Duke of Wellington, which, in addition to biographical memorabilia of the Duke's life, also houses his collection world-famous paintings.  Other biographical museums, such as many of the American presidential libraries, are housed in specially constructed buildings.

See also

 Ennigaldi-Nanna's museum
 International Council of Museums
 International Museum Day (18 May)
 List of museums
 .museum
 Museum education
 Museum fatigue
 Museum label
 Types of museum

References

Types of museums